Samote is a Town and Capital of Union Council Samote, Tehsil Kallar Syedan, District Rawalpindi Samote is  from Kallar Syedan,  from Rawalpindi City,  from Islamabad,  from Dadyal,  from Gujar Khan.Samote Was Under, NA-50, National Assembly and PP-7, Punjab Assembly In General elections 2008 Samote Was Gon Under PP-2, Punjab Assembly In Next General elections 2018 Samote is Under NA-58, National Assembly and PP-7, Punjab Assembly,Page 12 NA-57.Choha Khalsa

Languages
 Pothwari: 90%
 Urdu 5%
 Pashto 3%
 Other 2%

Schools and colleges 
 Haqani Public School & College Samote
 Government Boyes Higher Scendery School Samote
 Government Girls Higher Secondary School Samote
 Misali Public High School Samote

Hospital 
Government Hospital Smote

Police Chowke 
Samote Police Checke Work Under Kallar Syedan Police Station

References

YouTube channel samote.tv
 http://www.pothwar.com/tehkallar
 https://pak.postcodebase.com/node/8274
 http://locations.westernunion.com/pk/punjab/kallar-syedan/a94e8702ac76350ffdcdba541424ecb4?loc=Samote%2C+Rawalpindi%2C+Punjab%2C+Pakistan
 https://www.facebook.com/Samote-Pakistan-1149013045127110/
 UBL Rawalpindi 21 http://www.pakistanbanks.org/members/networks/ubl_network.html#RAWALPINDI#21Samote

Populated places in Kallar Syedan Tehsil
Towns in Kallar Syedan Tehsil